Pavao may refer to:

 Pavao (given name), a Croatian name
 Pavão (disambiguation), a Portuguese name